Father Muller Charitable Institutions (FMCI) is an organisation established in 1880 which regulates the religious minority educational and medical institutions founded by Father Augustus Muller. The FMCI is run by the Roman Catholic Diocese of Mangalore. Its president is the Bishop of Mangalore, Most.Rev.Dr. Peter Paul Saldanha.

History
Fr. Augustus Muller S. J. was a German Jesuit priest who popularized homeopathic medicine in Mangalore. He was sent to Mangalore from Venice, along with eight other Jesuits, to teach French and mathematics at the St. Aloysius College. A trained homeopath, he began treating students under a banyan tree in the college campus. As his reputation grew, so did the number of patients. In order to accommodate them, he purchased land in Kankanady and started the Homoeopathic Poor Dispensary. He was recognized for his contribution to society by the British Raj with the Kaisar-i-Hind award. He started treating lepers in 1883, and founded the St. Joseph Leprosy Hospital at Kankanady in 1890. He died on 1 November 1910 due to complications caused by asthma at the age of 69.

FMCI Hospitals

 Father Muller Medical College Hospital
 Father Muller Homeopathic Medical College Hospital
 Father Muller Homeopathic Pharmaceutical Division (HPD)
 St Joseph Leprosy Hospital
 Father Muller Rehabilitation Unit
 Father Muller De-addiction Centre

FMCI Educational Institutions

 Father Muller Medical College
 Father Muller Homeopathic Medical College
 Father Muller College of Speech & hearing
 Father Muller College of Allied Health Sciences
 Father Muller College of Nursing
 Father Muller School of Nursing
 Father Muller College of Distance Education

Death centenary celebrations of Fr. Muller (1910–2010) 
The Father Muller Charitable Institutions (FMCI) celebrated the death centenary of Fr. Muller on 1 November 2010. The chief guest of the function was the police commissioner of Mangalore City, Seemanth Kumar Singh, of the Indian Police Service. The ceremony was presided over by the Bishop of Mangalore and chairman of the FMCI, Rev. Dr. Aloysius Paul D'Souza, who laid the foundation stone for the new building for the Father Muller College of Nursing. The Father Muller Museum was inaugurated as a part of the centenary celebrations.

References

External links
 Fr.Muller Charitable Institutions – Official site

Organisations based in Mangalore
Organizations established in 1880
1880 establishments in India